The 1974 National Professional Soccer League season was the fourth season of the National Professional Soccer League, a South African soccer league. It was won by Kaizer Chiefs.

At the time, due to the country's apartheid policies, the competition was only open to black South African teams, and it ran in parallel with the FPL and the NFL

Table

References

1974
1974 in South African sport
1974–75 in African association football leagues